Singrauli district is one of the districts in the Indian state of Madhya Pradesh.

History
It was previously ruled by the Maharajas of Singrauli State till 1971, after which the monarchy was abolished. Singrauli district has its headquarters at Waidhan. It was the largest district in the Bagelkhand Division of Vindhya Pradesh. Singrauli is emerging as India's energy capital.

Just two generations ago, smallholders were tending their parcels of land here, and the original inhabitants were gathering honey and herbs in the forest. In the late fifties, a large scale dam banked up the water of the River Rihand. The dam known as Govind Vallabh Pant Sagar was inaugurated by Pt. Jawahar Lal Nehru in 1962. Later, rich coal deposits spread over an area of 2200 km2 in the state of M.P. (eastern part of Sidhi District) and U.P. (southern part of Sonebhadra District) were discovered close to the artificial lake that could be used to generate electricity.

This area has a group of rock cut caves made in the 7-8th century AD in Mada, 32 km from Waidhan. The Mada caves are situated in Mada tehsil of Singrauli district. Famous caves include Vivah Mada, Ganesh Mada and Shankar Mada, Jaljalia and Ravan Mada.

Besides rock cut caves, Singrauli also has painted rock shelters. Ranimachi, Dholagiri and Goura pahad lie in Chitrangi tehsil of Singrauli. These painted rock shelters belong to the Mesolithic age of microlithic implements culture. These paintings are representative of the early history of Indian art and are made of red ochre.

Pollution threatens the shelters. Connectivity by road is very poor. This has been evident for several years but no action has been taken yet to improve road transport and quality of buses.

Geography

Divisions
Singrauli district comprises three tehsils, namely, Singrauli, Deosar and Chitrangi Vidhan Sabha.
Later two more tehsils have been added to this district viz. Mada and Sarai.

Politics  
There are three Madhya Pradesh Vidhan Sabha constituencies in this district, namely, Chitrangi, Singrauli and Deosar. All of these are part of Sidhi Lok Sabha constituency The MLA of Singrauli tehsil is Ram lallu vaishya, Amar Singh of chitrangi tehsil and Subhash Verma of Deosar. MP of Singrauli constituency is Riti Pathak along with sidhi. Mayor of Singrauli is Rani Agrawal.

Demographics

According to the 2011 census Singrauli district has a population of 1,178,273, roughly equal to the nation of Timor-Leste or the US state of Rhode Island. This gives it a ranking of 402nd in India (out of a total of 640). Its population growth rate over the decade 2001-2011 was 28.03%. Singrauli has a sex ratio of 916 females for every 1000 males, and a literacy rate of 62.36%. 19.25% of the population lives in urban areas. Scheduled Castes and Tribes made up 12.79% and 32.59% of the population respectively. The largest tribes are the Gonds, who are 50% of the tribal population, and Kols, 16% of the tribal population.

At the time of the 2011 Census of India, 89.59% of the population in the district spoke Hindi, 4.49% Bagheli and 1.64% Gondi as their first language.

Education
Singrauli district is home to a unique ambidextrous school named Veena Vandini School in Budhela village, where students are taught to write simultaneously with both hands. The school was setup by a former Army soldier Shri V.P. Sharma in July 1999. Most famous and well known schools of Singrauli includes DPS Vindhyanagar, DePaul and SSM.

Economy
Singrauli is also known as Energy Capital of India. The Rihand Dam was built in 1961 across the Rihand River at Pipri in the neighbouring district of Sonbhadra, in Uttar Pradesh. That led to the transformation and development of the area.

Coal mining and power
Northern Coalfields is the major business of the district. The headquarters of the company are at Singrauli.  The company is a subsidiary of Coal India, which is the largest coal producing company in world.

The Singrauli Coalfield can be divided into two basins, viz. Moher sub-basin (312 km2.) and Singrauli Main basin (1890 km2.). The major part of the Moher sub-basin lies in the Sidhi district of Madhya Pradesh and a small part lies in the Sonebhadra district of Uttar Pradesh. Singrauli main basin lies in the western part of the coalfield and is largely unexplored. The present coal mining activities and future blocks are concentrated in Moher sub-basin. Lignite is the form of coal excavated from these coal mines. These coal mines are a hub for the Heavy Earth Moving Machines (HEMM).

The exploration carried out by GSI/NCDC/CMPDI has proved abundant resource of power grade coal in the area. This in conjunction with easy water resource from Govind Ballabh Pant Sagar makes this region an ideal location for high capacity pithead power plants. The coal supplies from NCL has made it possible to produce more than 11000 MW of electricity from pithead power plants of National Thermal Power Corporation (NTPC),  The region is now called the Energy Capital of India. The ultimate capacity of power generation of these power plants is 13295 MW and NCL is fully prepared to meet the increased demand of coal for the purpose. In addition, NCL supplies coal to power plants of Rajasthan Rajya Vidyut Utpadan Nigam, Delhi Vidyut Board (DVB) and Haryana Power Generation Corporation Limited.

NCL produces coal through mechanised opencast mines but its commitments towards environmental protection is total. It is one of very few companies engaged in mining activities, which has got ISO –14001 Certification for its environmental systems.

NCL, through its community development programmes, has significantly contributed towards improvement and development of the area. It is helping local tribal, non-tribal and project-affected persons in overall improvement of quality of their life through self-employments schemes, imparting education and providing health care.

Industries

All major companies operating in Singrauli are giants of Indian energy industry. The operations of companies include mining of coal to power generation. In recent past, several private companies have also joined the league of companies operating in Singrauli. It is expected by 2017, that Singrauli would feed around 35,000 MW of electrical power to the grid alone.

Major companies operating or coming up at Singrauli are:

MISCELLANEOUS:-
 A Power plant is going to be set at Koyalkhooth & Baheri by L&T Power
BEML Limited (Under Ministry of Defence) Manufacture of HEMM
  Voltas Limited (A TATA Enterprise) Manufacture of HEMM.
Reliance Infrastructure
Mercedes Benz (for mining)

Culture
The famous temples of Singrauli are Hanuman Mandir of Jhingurdah, about 8 kilometres from the city and Jwala Mukhi about 15 km from Singrauli Rly. station. Other temples include Gayatri temple, Jain temple & Shiv Mandir, situated at Vindhyanagar, 15 km from Singrauli. Jagannath Temple, Jayant, is a famous Hindu shrine (Lord Jagannath). The most prominent festivals in this area are Durga pooja and Deepawali. In Hanuman mandir a grand mela (fair) is also organised.famous Shree Ganeshji temple, Deosar is located in khadaura village near deosar.

References

https://books.google.co.in/books?id=mhD3_1H7B90C&pg=PA793&lpg=PA793&dq=singrauli+kharwar+raja+of+history&source=bl&ots=W3ZOhA0zQY&sig=ACfU3U3SYGfxaiaQvRFhY8QJgwzbCATv4g&hl=en&sa=X&ved=2ahUKEwj8jLaSkLrvAhVqyzgGHW5vC6c4ChDoATAGegQIDBAC#v=onepage&q=singrauli%20kharwar%20raja%20of%20history&f=false

External links

Official website - administrative website of singrauli district

 
Districts of Madhya Pradesh
Coal mining districts in India